Cao Song (died 193), courtesy name Jugao, was an official who lived during the Eastern Han dynasty of China. He was the foster son of the eunuch Cao Teng and the father of the warlord Cao Cao, who rose to prominence in the final years of Eastern Han and laid the foundation of the state of Cao Wei in the Three Kingdoms period. Cao Song was posthumously honoured as "Emperor Tai" ("Grand Emperor") by his grandson Cao Pi in 220 when the latter ended the Han dynasty and founded the Cao Wei regime.

Career
Cao Song was known to be honest, sincere and of good moral conduct. He served as the Colonel-Director of Retainers in the Han imperial court. During the reign of Emperor Ling, he served consecutively as the Minister of Finance and Minister Herald before replacing Cui Lie (崔烈) as the Grand Commandant. However, it was alleged that Cao Song obtained the post of Grand Commandant by bribing eunuchs, who were deeply trusted by the emperor. Another account stated that Cao Song purchased those official posts because Emperor Ling introduced a practice of selling political offices for money.

Death
Around 193, Cao Song retired and returned to his hometown in Qiao County (譙縣; present-day Bozhou, Anhui). Along the way, he was murdered while passing through Langya State (琅玡國; present-day Linyi, Shandong) in Xu Province. At the same time, Cao Song's eldest son, the warlord Cao Cao, had established a base in Yan Province (covering present-day southwestern Shandong and eastern Henan).

There are three different accounts of Cao Song's death:

 An account from Wei Zhao's Wu Shu stated that Cao Song had with him more than 100 carts full of his personal belongings. Tao Qian sent one of his officers, Zhang Kai, and 200 horsemen to escort Cao Song and his family to Yan Province. At Hua County, Zhang Kai murdered Cao Song, seized his riches and fled to Huainan.
 The Houhanshu wrote that Cao Song was travelling to Langya Commandery to evade chaos. Along the way, he passed by Yinping County (陰平縣; southwest of present-day Zaozhuang, Shandong), where Tao Qian had garrisoned some troops. Tempted by greed, Tao Qian's men killed Cao Song and seized his wealth.
 The Shiyu mentioned that Cao Song was in Hua County (華縣; north of present-day Fei County, Shandong) at the time. Cao Cao ordered Ying Shao, the Administrator of Taishan Commandery (泰山郡; east of present-day Tai'an, Shandong), to escort his father and family to Yan Province. However, before Ying Shao's men arrived, Xu Province's governor Tao Qian secretly sent a few thousand riders to attack Cao Song and his family. Cao Song thought that Ying Shao had come to receive him, so he was unprepared and completely taken by surprise. Tao Qian's men killed Cao De, one of Cao Song's sons. Cao Song became afraid and brought one of his concubines with him as they tried to squeeze through a crack in a wall to escape. However, Cao Song's concubine was too fat and could not squeeze through, so they hid in the latrine. Tao Qian's men found them eventually and killed Cao Song and all his family members who were with him at the time.

All the accounts agree that Cao Cao held Tao Qian responsible for the murder of his father regardless of the degree of Tao Qian's involvement in the incident. This led to Cao Cao launching an invasion on Xu Province between 193 and 194 to punish Tao Qian for his role in Cao Song's death.

Posthumous honour
In 220, Cao Cao's son and successor, Cao Pi, ended the Eastern Han dynasty and established the state of Cao Wei, marking the start of the Three Kingdoms period. Cao Pi granted his grandfather the posthumous title "Emperor Tai" ("Grand Emperor").

Family background
Cao Song's family background is a mystery. Chen Shou wrote in the Sanguozhi that Cao Song's origin could not be determined. The Cao Man Zhuan and the Shiyu, two sources used by Pei Songzhi in his annotations to the Sanguozhi, mentioned that Cao Song's original family name was Xiahou and that he was an uncle of Xiahou Dun. Therefore, Cao Cao and Xiahou Dun were cousins.

The Qing dynasty scholar He Zhuo (何焯; 1661–1722) refuted the claim in the Cao Man Zhuan and Shiyu that Cao Song was from the Xiahou clan and dismissed it as a rumour started by people from Eastern Wu, a state founded by Cao Cao's rival, Sun Quan. This was because Xiahou Dun's son Xiahou Mao married Cao Cao's daughter Princess Qinghe, and Xiahou Yuan's son Xiahou Heng married Cao Cao's niece, so the Xiahous and Caos could not have shared the same lineage.

On the other hand, the Qing dynasty historians Pan Mei (潘眉; 1771–1841) and Lin Guozan believed it was true that Cao Song was a Xiahou, as evident from the fact that Chen Shou placed the biographies of Xiahou Dun, Xiahou Yuan, Xiahou Shang, Cao Ren, Cao Hong, Cao Xiu, Cao Zhen in the same volume (volume 9) in the Sanguozhi.

Li Jingxing (李景星; 1876–1934), a scholar who lived in the late Qing dynasty, speculated that when Chen Shou wrote that Cao Song's origin could not be determined, his intention was to expose a scandal behind Cao Cao's family background.

Wu Jinhua, a history professor from Fudan University, believed that Chen Shou employed a writing technique to distort facts when he wrote that Cao Song's origin could not be determined. Wu consolidated all the earlier differing viewpoints and pointed out three pieces of evidence to prove that Cao Song was from the Xiahou family:

 The Weilüe recorded a letter written by Sun Quan to the Wei official Hao Zhou sometime between 220 and 222, when Sun was nominally a vassal of the Wei regime. The letter mentioned that Hao Zhou suggested that Sun Quan's son could establish marital ties with the Cao family in the same way as how the Caos and Xiahous were connected by marriages. This proved that the claim that Cao Song was a Xiahou was not a rumour spread by people from Wu because a person from Wei already spoke of it sometime between 220 and 222.
 The Wei Shu mentioned that when Xiahou Dun died, Cao Pi dressed in plain clothing and mourned at the eastern gate of Ye (in present-day Handan, Hebei). The Eastern Jin dynasty historian Sun Sheng commented that it was still within traditions for an emperor to mourn his kinsmen outside of an ancestral temple, and that Cao Pi had clearly lost his composure when he cried for Xiahou Dun at the city gate. As Sun Sheng lived during the Eastern Jin dynasty (317–420), not long after the Three Kingdoms period ended in 280, his remark gave an impression that the people in his time were already aware that Cao Song was from the Xiahou clan.
 Between 1974 and 1979, parts of a tombstone from Cao Cao's family ancestral tomb were unearthed in Bozhou, Anhui (the ancestral home of Cao Cao's clan). The Chinese characters "xia hou you"  were inscribed on it.

The late Qing dynasty writer Zhou Shouchang (周壽昌; 1814–1884) explained in Sanguozhi Zhu Zheng Yi about the inter-clan marriages between the Caos and Xiahous. He cited Chen Jiao (陳矯) as an example – Chen Jiao's original family name was "Liu". He was raised by his uncle (his paternal aunt's husband), whose family name was "Chen", and adopted "Chen" as his family name. Chen Jiao later married the daughter of Liu Song, a close relative. Cao Cao appreciated Chen Jiao's talent and wanted to protect Chen's reputation, so he gave an order forbidding any dissent about Chen's personal life. Zhou Shouchang felt that when Cao Cao banned people from speaking against marriages between those who share the same family name, he was actually making it convenient to cover up his own family background.

Wu Jinhua also pointed out that in the late Han dynasty and the Three Kingdoms period, it was not uncommon to find married couples who shared the same family name. For example, one of Cao Cao's foster sons, He Yan, married Cao's daughter Princess Jinxiang, who was possibly his half-sister (born to the same mother), even though the identity of the princess's mother is not confirmed. Wu Jinhua mentioned that a person will have no doubts that Cao Song was from the Xiahou clan as long as he/she understands that inter-clan marriages were not unusual in that era.

Others such as history professors Zhu Ziyan and Han Sheng argue that the accounts from the Cao Man Zhuan and Shiyu are not reliable, and the fact that Xiahou Mao, Xiahou Heng and Xiahou Shang married women from Cao Cao's clan proved that Cao Song was not a Xiahou.

See also
 Lists of people of the Three Kingdoms
 Cao Wei family trees#Cao Song

Notes

References

 Chen Shou (3rd century). Records of the Three Kingdoms (Sanguozhi).
 
 Fan Ye (5th century). Book of the Later Han (Houhanshu).
 Pei Songzhi (5th century). Annotations to Records of the Three Kingdoms (Sanguozhi zhu).

Year of birth unknown
193 deaths
2nd-century births
Family of Cao Cao
Politicians from Bozhou
Han dynasty politicians from Anhui
Assassinated Chinese politicians